Godfrey Mwampembwa, pen name Gado (1969) is a Tanzanian-born political cartoonist, animator and comics artist. He is the most syndicated political cartoonist in East and Central Africa, and for over two decades a contributor for Daily Nation (Kenya), New African (United Kingdom), Courrier International (France) as well as for Business Day and Sunday Tribune (both South Africa). He also produced cartoons for Le Monde, The Washington Times, Der Standard and Japan Times.

He served as an editorial cartoonist at the Daily Nation until he was fired in March 2016.

Education
Gado joined the Ardhi Institute in 1991 to study architecture. After a year he left the institute to become the Nation Media Group cartoonist and illustrator. In 2000 he studied classical animation and film at the film school in Vancouver.

Career
Gado designs funny cartoons on local regional and international issues, which he clarifies the impact of social, political and cultural conflicts have on the individual. With great simplicity he brings brittle elements up without going to the essential humanity of these topics.<ref name="PCP2007GM">Prins Claus Prijs (2007) [http://www.princeclausfund.org/nl/network/user/id/196 Korte biografie Godfrey Mwampembwa] </ref>

Gado opposes political interference and is a local pioneer who explores his limits. He is an inspiration for other artists through its contribution to the democratization and the freedom of expression in eastern Africa . He is the most syndicated cartoonist in East and Central Africa. During his stay at Fabrica research centre in Treviso, Italy, he produced an animation film on racism. 

Awards
In 1996 he was awarded the International Olympic Media Award for print media, and in 1999 was Mwampembwa Cartoonist of the Year Kenya.

In 2007 he was awarded the Prince Claus Award of the Prince Claus Fund in the Netherlands for the theme Culture and conflict. The jury praised him for "his courageous cartoons, which he humorously shows aspects of social and political conflicts, and an inspiration to the struggle of free expression."

In 2014 & 2016, Gado was named as one of the 100 most influential people in Africa by The NewAfrican, Africa’s most influential magazine. Together with cartoonist Zunar from Malaysia, Gado received the Cartooning For Peace Award'' by Kofi Annan on world Press Day, May 3, 2016.

Works
 Abunuwasi
 An animated cartoon for MTV

References

External links
 
 Gado's former website (archive)
 Profile of Gado 

1969 births
Tanzanian cartoonists
Tanzanian editorial cartoonists
Living people